is the eighth single released by Nana Kitade, and the second single from her album, I Scream The song gained attention after being featured as the 1st opening song for "PowerPuff Girls Z". It was being featured on the original soundtrack. "Pieces of Hope" reached #64 on the Oricon singles chart and charted for 2 weeks.

Track listing

Music video
The video for "Kibou no Kakera" Starts off by showing A stuffed "rabbit", "bear", and "panda", and then Nana. It leads up to the animals becoming Kitade's Band and performing throughout the video. At the end of the video, the animals change back into their stuffed form where Nana is seen holding them.

Charts

References

External links

 Nana Kitade Official Web Site Sony Music Japan (Japanese)

2006 singles
Nana Kitade songs
Songs written by Nana Kitade